Tamara van Ark (born 11 August 1974) is a Dutch politician of the People's Party for Freedom and Democracy (VVD). She served as Minister for Medical Care from 9 July 2020 until 3 September 2021 and as State Secretary for Social Affairs and Employment from 26 October 2017 until 9 July 2020 in the Cabinet Rutte III.

Early life and education
Van Ark received a propaedeutic diploma from the Rotterdam Hogeschool voor Economische Studies (now named the Rotterdam Business School) of the Rotterdam University of Applied Sciences in 1994. She went subsequently to the Erasmus University Rotterdam where she obtained an MSc degree in Public Administration in 1998.

Political career

Career in local politics
As a member of the People's Party for Freedom and Democracy, Van Ark was an alderwoman of the former municipality of Nieuwerkerk aan den IJssel from 2004 to 2010 and of its successor, the Zuidplas municipality in 2010.

Career in national politics
In the 2010 Dutch general election, Van Ark was elected to the House of Representatives (or Second Chamber). As a parliamentarian from 17 June 2010, she focused on matters of long-term care. She was also involved, with other officeholders, with a law proposal against labour discrimination of homosexuals.

Van Ark was reelected to the House of Representatives in 2012 and 2017. She remaine a member of the House of Representatives until her appointment as State Secretary on 26 October 2017.

Minister of Medical Care, 2020–2021
On 9 July 2020, Van Ark succeeded Martin van Rijn as Minister for Medical Care. Since 2020, she has also been a member of the Global Leaders Group on Antimicrobial Resistance, co-chaired by Sheikh Hasina and Mia Mottley.

Following the 2021 national elections, Van Ark and Wouter Koolmees of the Democrats 66 party were chosen to lead their parties' negotiations on a coalition agreement.

References

External links
  Drs. T. (Tamara) van Ark at the PDC Biographical Archive (Parlement.com), by the Parliamentary Documentary Centre of Leiden University
  Tamara van Ark at the Dutch government English language website

1974 births
Living people
20th-century Dutch civil servants
21st-century Dutch politicians
21st-century Dutch women politicians
Aldermen in South Holland
Dutch management consultants
Dutch social workers
Women government ministers of the Netherlands
Erasmus University Rotterdam alumni
Members of the House of Representatives (Netherlands)
Ministers without portfolio of the Netherlands
People from Nieuwerkerk aan den IJssel
Politicians from The Hague
People from Zuidplas
People's Party for Freedom and Democracy politicians
State Secretaries for Social Affairs of the Netherlands